The Bar Kokhba revolt (Mereḏ Bar Kōḵḇāʾ‎), or the 'Jewish Expedition' as the Romans named it, was a rebellion by the Jews of the Roman province of Judea, led by Simon bar Kokhba, against the Roman Empire. Fought  CE, it was the last of three major Jewish–Roman wars, so it is also known as the Third Jewish–Roman War or, the Third Jewish Revolt. Some historians also refer to it as the Second Revolt of Judea, not counting the Kitos War (115–117 CE), which had only marginally been fought in Judea.

The revolt erupted as a result of religious and political tensions in Judea following on the failed First Revolt in 66–73 CE. These tensions were related to the establishment of a large Roman military presence in Judea, changes in administrative life and the economy, together with the outbreak and suppression of Jewish revolts in the diaspora. The proximate reasons seem to be the construction of a new city, Aelia Capitolina, over the ruins of Jerusalem and the erection of a temple to Jupiter on the Temple Mount. The Church Fathers and rabbinic literature emphasize the role of Rufus, governor of Judea, in provoking the revolt. Historian Menahem Mor prefers to attribute the main cause of the revolt to the charismatic and politically messianic nature of Bar Kokhba himself. 

In 132, the revolt quickly spread from central Judea across the province, cutting off the Roman garrison in Aelia Capitolina. Rufus was attributed with the failure to subdue its early phase; whether he died or was replaced is uncertain. Despite arrival of significant Roman reinforcements from Syria, Egypt, and Arabia, initial rebel victories established an independent state over most parts of the province for over three years, as Bar Kokhba took the title of Nasi ("head of state"). Many Jews regarded him as the Messiah, who would restore their national independence. This setback, however, caused Emperor Hadrian to assemble a large-scale army from across the Empire, which invaded Judea in 134 under the command of General Sextus Julius Severus. This army was made up of six full legions with auxiliaries and elements from up to six additional legions, which finally crushed the revolt.

The Bar Kokhba revolt resulted in the extensive depopulation of the Jewish communities of Judea, more so than during the First Jewish–Roman War. Some scholars describe it as a genocide. According to Cassius Dio, 580,000 Jews perished in the war and many more died of hunger and disease, 50 fortresses and 985 villages were destroyed. In addition, a large number of war captives were sold into slavery. While the majority of contemporary scholars assert that Dio's statistics were somewhat exaggerated, they generally agree with his assertion that there had been a massive depopulation. The Jewish population remained strong in Galilee, Golan, Bet Shean Valley, and the fringes of Judea. Roman casualties were also considered heavy – XXII Deiotariana was disbanded, perhaps due to serious losses.

The Bar Kokhba revolt greatly influenced the course of Jewish history and the philosophy of the Jewish religion. Despite easing the persecution of Jews following Hadrian's death in 138 CE, the Romans barred Jews from Jerusalem, except for attendance in Tisha B'Av. Jewish messianism was abstracted and spiritualized, and rabbinical political thought became deeply cautious and conservative. The Talmud, for instance, refers to Bar Kokhba as "Ben-Kusiba", a derogatory term meaning "son of deception", used to indicate that he was a false Messiah. It was also among the key events to differentiate Christianity as a religion distinct from Judaism. Although Jewish Christians regarded Jesus as the Messiah and did not support Bar Kokhba, they were barred from Jerusalem along with the other Jews.

Background

After the First Jewish–Roman War (66–73 CE), the Roman authorities took measures to suppress the rebellious province of Roman Judea. Instead of a procurator, they installed a praetor as a governor and stationed an entire legion, the X Fretensis, in the area. Tensions continued to build up in the wake of the Kitos War, the second large-scale Jewish insurrection in the Eastern Mediterranean during 115–117, the final stages of which saw fighting in Judea. Mismanagement of the province during the early 2nd century might well have led to the proximate causes of the revolt, largely bringing governors with clear anti-Jewish sentiments to run the province. Gargilius Antiques may have preceded Rufus during the 120s. The Church Fathers and rabbinic literature emphasize the role of Rufus in provoking the revolt.

Historians have suggested multiple reasons for the sparking of the Bar Kokhba revolt, long-term and proximate. Several elements are believed to have contributed to the rebellion; changes in administrative law, the diffuse presence of Romans, alterations in agricultural practice with a shift from landowning to sharecropping, the impact of a possible period of economic decline, and an upsurge of nationalism, the latter influenced by similar revolts among the Jewish communities in Egypt, Cyrenaica and Mesopotamia during the reign of Trajan in the Kitos War.

The proximate reasons seem to centre around the construction of a new city, Aelia Capitolina, over the ruins of Jerusalem and the erection of a temple to Jupiter on the Temple mount. Until recently, some historians had tried to question the Colonia foundation event as one of the causes of the revolt, suggesting to rather time the Colonia establishment to the aftermath of the revolt as a punishment. However, the 2014 archaeological finding of the Legio Fretensis inscription in Jerusalem dedicated to Hadrian and dated to 129/130 CE, as well as identification of Colonia Aelia Capitolina struck coins have since been largely accepted as confirmation to the sequence of events depicted in Jewish traditional literature. One interpretation involves the visit in 130 CE of Hadrian to the ruins of the Jewish Temple in Jerusalem. At first sympathetic towards the Jews, Hadrian promised to rebuild the Temple, but the Jews felt betrayed when they found out that he intended to build a temple dedicated to Jupiter upon the ruins of the Second Temple. A rabbinic version of this story claims that Hadrian planned on rebuilding the Temple, but that a malevolent Samaritan convinced him not to. The reference to a malevolent Samaritan is, however, a familiar device of Jewish literature.

An additional legion, the VI Ferrata, arrived in the province to maintain order. Works on Aelia Capitolina, as Jerusalem was to be called, commenced in 131 CE. The governor of Judea, Tineius Rufus, performed the foundation ceremony, which involved ploughing over the designated city limits. "Ploughing up the Temple", seen as a religious offence, turned many Jews against the Roman authorities. The Romans issued a coin inscribed Aelia Capitolina.

A disputed tradition, based on the single source of the Historia Augusta, regarded as 'unreliable and problematic,' states tensions rose after Hadrian banned circumcision, referred to as mutilare genitalia  taken to mean brit milah. Were the claim true it has been conjectured that Hadrian, as a Hellenist, would have viewed circumcision as an undesirable form of mutilation. The claim is often considered suspect.

Timeline of events

First phase

Eruption of the revolt
Jewish leaders carefully planned the second revolt to avoid the numerous mistakes that had plagued the first First Jewish–Roman War sixty years earlier. In 132, the revolt, led by Simon bar Kokhba and Elasar, quickly spread from Modi'in across the country, cutting off the Roman garrison in Jerusalem. Although Rufus was in charge during the early phase of the uprising, he disappears from the record after 132 for unknown reasons. Shortly after the eruption of the revolt, Bar Kokhba's rebels inflicted heavy casualties to Legio X Fretensis, based in Aelia Capitolina (Jerusalem). At that point, Legio VI Ferrata was sent to reinforce the Roman position from Legio base in Yizrael Valley, fielding altogether some 20,000 Roman troops, but was unable to subdue the rebels, who nearly conquered Jerusalem.

Stalemate and reinforcements
Given the continuing inability of Legio X and Legio VI to subdue the rebels, additional reinforcements were dispatched from neighbouring provinces. Gaius Poblicius Marcellus, the Legate of Roman Syria, arrived commanding Legio III Gallica, while Titus Haterius Nepos, the governor of Roman Arabia, brought Legio III Cyrenaica. Later on it is proposed by some historians that Legio XXII Deiotariana was sent from Arabia Petraea, but was ambushed and massacred on its way to Aelia Capitolina (Jerusalem), and possibly disbanded as a result. Legio II Traiana Fortis, previously stationed in Egypt, may have also arrived in Judea in this stage. By that time the number of Roman troops in Judea stood at nearly 80,000—a number still inferior to rebel forces, who were also more familiar with the terrain and occupied strong fortifications.

Many Jews from the diaspora made their way to Judea to join Bar Kokhba's forces from the beginning of the rebellion, with the Talmud recorded tradition that hard tests were imposed on recruits due to the inflated number of volunteers. Some documents seem to indicate that many of those who enlisted in Bar Kokhba's forces could only speak Greek, and it is unclear whether these were Jews or non-Jews. According to Rabbinic sources some 400,000 men were at the disposal of Bar Kokhba at the peak of the rebellion.

Second phase

From guerilla warfare to open engagement
The outbreak and initial success of the rebellion took the Romans by surprise. The rebels incorporated combined tactics to fight the Roman Army. According to some historians, Bar Kokhba's army mostly practiced guerrilla warfare, inflicting heavy casualties. This view is largely supported by Cassius Dio, who wrote that the revolt began with covert attacks in line with preparation of hideout systems, though after taking over the fortresses Bar Kokhba turned to direct engagement due to his superiority in numbers.

Rebel Judean statehood 

Simon Bar Kokhba took the title Nasi Israel and ruled over an entity named Israel that was virtually independent for over two and a half years. The Jewish sage Rabbi Akiva, who was the spiritual leader of the revolt, identified Simon Bar Kosiba as the Jewish messiah, and gave him the surname "Bar Kokhba" meaning "Son of a Star" in the Aramaic language, from the Star Prophecy verse from Numbers : "There shall come a star out of Jacob". The name Bar Kokhba does not appear in the Talmud but in ecclesiastical sources. The era of the redemption of Israel was announced, contracts were signed and a large quantity of Bar Kokhba Revolt coinage was struck over foreign coins.

From open warfare to rebel defensive tactics
With the slowly advancing Roman army cutting supply lines, the rebels engaged in long-term defense. The defense system of Judean towns and villages was based mainly on hideout caves, which were created in large numbers in almost every population center. Many houses utilized underground hideouts, where Judean rebels hoped to withstand Roman superiority by the narrowness of the passages and even ambushes from underground. The cave systems were often interconnected and used not only as hideouts for the rebels but also for storage and refuge for their families. Hideout systems were employed in the Judean hills, the Judean desert, northern Negev, and to some degree also in Galilee, Samaria and Jordan Valley. As of July 2015, some 350 hideout systems have been mapped within the ruins of 140 Jewish villages.

Third phase

Julius Severus' campaign
Following a series of setbacks, Hadrian called his general Sextus Julius Severus from Britannia, and troops were brought from as far as the Danube. In 133/4, Severus landed in Judea with a massive army, bringing three legions from Europe (including Legio X Gemina and possibly also Legio IX Hispana), cohorts of additional legions and between 30 and 50 auxiliary units. He took the title of provincial governor and initiated a massive campaign to systematically subdue Judean rebel forces. Severus' arrival almost doubled the number of Roman troops facing the rebels.

The size of the Roman army amassed against the rebels was much larger than that commanded by Titus sixty years earlier - nearly one third of the Roman army took part in the campaign against Bar Kokhba. It is estimated that forces from at least 10 legions participated in Severus' campaign in Judea, including Legio X Fretensis, Legio VI Ferrata, Legio III Gallica, Legio III Cyrenaica, Legio II Traiana Fortis, Legio X Gemina, cohorts of Legio V Macedonica, cohorts of Legio XI Claudia, cohorts of Legio XII Fulminata and cohorts of Legio IV Flavia Felix, along with 30–50 auxiliary units, for a total force of 60,000–120,000 Roman soldiers facing Bar Kokhba's rebels. It is plausible that Legio IX Hispana was among the legions Severus brought with him from Europe, and that its demise occurred during Severus' campaign, as its disappearance during the second century is often attributed to this war.

Battle of Tel Shalem (theory)
According to some views one of the crucial battles of the war took place near Tel Shalem in the Beit She'an valley, near what is now identified as the legionary camp of Legio VI Ferrata. This theory was proposed by Werner Eck in 1999, as part of his general maximalist work which did put the Bar Kokhba revolt as a very prominent event on the course of the Roman Empire's history. Next to the camp, archaeologists unearthed the remnants of a triumphal arch, which featured a dedication to Emperor Hadrian, which most likely refers to the defeat of Bar Kokhba's army. Additional finds at Tel Shalem, including a bust of Emperor Hadrian, specifically link the site to the period. The theory for a major decisive battle in Tel Shalem implies a significant extension of the area of the rebellion, with Werner Eck suggesting the war encompassed also northern Valleys together with Galilee.

Judean highlands and desert

Simon bar Kokhba declared Herodium as his secondary headquarters. Its commander was Yeshua ben Galgula, likely Bar Kokhba's second or third line of command. Archaeological evidence for the revolt was found all over the site, from the outside buildings to the water system under the mountain. Inside the water system, supporting walls built by the rebels were discovered, and another system of caves was found. Inside one of the caves, burned wood was found which was dated to the time of the revolt. The fortress was besieged by the Romans in late 134 and was taken by the end of the year or early in 135.

Fourth phase
The last phase of the revolt is characterized by Bar Kokhba's loss of territorial control, with the exception of the surroundings of the Betar fortress, where he made his last stand against the Romans. The Roman Army had meanwhile turned to eradicate smaller fortresses and hideout systems of captured villages, turning the conquest into a campaign of annihilation.

Siege of Betar

After losing many of their strongholds, Bar Kokhba and the remnants of his army withdrew to the fortress of Betar, which subsequently came under siege in the summer of 135. Legio V Macedonica and Legio XI Claudia are said to have taken part in the siege. According to Jewish tradition, the fortress was breached and destroyed on the fast of Tisha B'av, the ninth day of the lunar month Av, a day of mourning for the destruction of the First and the Second Jewish Temple. Rabbinical literature ascribes the defeat to Bar Kokhba killing his maternal uncle, Rabbi Elazar Hamudaʻi, after suspecting him of collaborating with the enemy, thereby forfeiting Divine protection. The horrendous scene after the city's capture could be best described as a massacre. The Jerusalem Talmud relates that the number of dead in Betar was enormous, that the Romans "went on killing until their horses were submerged in blood to their nostrils."

Final accords

According to a rabbinic midrash, the Romans executed eight leading members of the Sanhedrin (The list of Ten Martyrs include two earlier rabbis): Rabbi Akiva; Rabbi Hanania ben Teradion; the interpreter of the Sanhedrin, Rabbi Huspith; Rabbi Eliezer ben Shamua; Rabbi Hanina ben Hakinai; Rabbi Jeshbab the Scribe; Rabbi Yehuda ben Dama; and Rabbi Yehuda ben Baba. The precise date of Akiva's execution is disputed, some suggesting to date it to the beginning of the revolt based on the midrash, while others link it to final phases. The rabbinic account describes agonizing tortures: Akiva was flayed with iron combs, Rabbi Ishmael had the skin of his head pulled off slowly, and Rabbi Hanania was burned at a stake, with wet wool held by a Torah scroll wrapped around his body to prolong his death. Bar Kokhba's fate is not certain, with two alternative traditions in the Babylonian Talmud ascribing the death of Bar Kokhba either to a snakebite or other natural causes during the Roman siege or possibly killed on the orders of the Sanhedrin, as a false messiah. According to Lamentations Rabbah, the head of Bar Kokhba was presented to Emperor Hadrian after the Siege of Betar.

Following the Fall of Betar, the Roman forces went on a rampage of systematic killing, eliminating all remaining Jewish villages in the region and seeking out the refugees. Legio III Cyrenaica was the main force to execute this last phase of the campaign. Historians disagree on the duration of the Roman campaign following the fall of Betar. While some claim further resistance was broken quickly, others argue that pockets of Jewish rebels continued to hide with their families into the winter months of late 135 and possibly even spring 136. By early 136 however, it is clear that the revolt was defeated.

Aftermath

Demographic consequences 
Modern historians view the Bar Kokhba Revolt as having decisive historic importance. They note that, unlike in the aftermath of the First Jewish–Roman War, the Jewish population of Judea was devastated after the revolt, with many Jews being killed, exiled, or sold into slavery. Some scholars describe the destruction of the Jewish communities in Judea as a genocide. Jewish religious and political authority was suppressed far more brutally than before, and the province of Judaea was renamed Syria Palaestina.

Casualties and widespread destruction 
In his account of the revolt, Roman historian Cassius Dio (–235) wrote that:In 1981, Schäfer suggested that Dio exaggerated his numbers. On the other hand, in 2003 Cotton considered Dio's figures highly plausible, in light of accurate Roman census declarations. In 2021, an ethno-archaeological comparison analysis by Dvir Raviv and Chaim Ben David was published, in which the two scholars assert of sufficient accuracy in Dio's depopulation claims, and describe it as a "reliable account, which he based on contemporaneous documentation".

As of today, no village in the region of Judea whose remains have been excavated so far has not been destroyed in the revolt.

Enslavement 
Sources indicate that Jewish captives were sold into slavery and sent to various parts of the empire. A chronicle written in the 7th century CE, which was based on lost ancient sources, states that "Jewish captives were sold for the price of one ration of food for a horse." This number indicates that the slave market was flooded with new slaves. According to Harris, the overall number of enslaved captives taken in the revolt must have been much higher than 100,000.

Displacement 
Eusebius writes that:

Jews were expelled from the area of Jerusalem. Menachem writes that Jews were expelled from the districts of Gophna, Herodion, and Aqraba. According to Klein, the Roman authorities replaced the departing and slain Jews with a population from the nearby provinces of Syria, Phoenicia, and Arabia. Captives who were not sold as slaves were deported to Gaza, Egypt and elsewhere, greatly adding to the Jewish diaspora.

In the aftermath of the defeat, the maintenance of Jewish settlement in Palestine became a major concern of the rabbis. They endeavored to halt Jewish dispersal, and even banned emigration from Palestine, branding those who settled outside its borders as idolaters.

Continuity 

While Jewish presence in the region significantly dwindled after the failure of the Bar Kokhba revolt, there was a continuous small Jewish presence and Galilee became its religious center. Some of the Judean survivors resettled in Galilee, with some rabbinical families gathering in Sepphoris. The Mishnah and part of the Talmud, central Jewish texts, were composed during the 2nd to 4th centuries CE in Galilee.

Jewish communities continued to live on the edges of Judea, including Eleutheropolis, Ein Gedi and the southern Hebron Hills. There were also Jewish communities along the coastal plain, in Caesarea, Beit She'an and on the Golan Heights.

Punitive measures against Jews 
After the suppression of the revolt, Hadrian promulgated a series of religious edicts aimed at uprooting the Jewish nationalism in Judea. He prohibited Torah law and the Hebrew calendar, and executed Judaic scholars. The sacred scrolls of Judaism were ceremonially burned at the large Temple complex for Jupiter which he built on the Temple Mount. At this Temple, he installed two statues, one of Jupiter, another of himself. These proclamations remained in effect until Hadrian’s death in 138, which marked a significant relief to the surviving Jewish communities.

A further, more lasting punishment was also implemented by the Romans. In an attempt to erase any memory of Judea or Ancient Israel, the name Judaea was dropped from the provincial name, and Provincia Iudaea was renamed Syria Palaestina. Despite such name changes taking place elsewhere, rebellions have never resulted in a nation's name being expunged. Similarly, under the argument to ensure the prosperity of the newly founded Roman colony of Aelia Capitolina, Jews were forbidden to enter, except on the day of Tisha B'Av. By destroying the association of Jews with Judea and forbidding the practice of the Jewish faith, Hadrian aimed to root out a nation that had inflicted heavy casualties on the Roman Empire.

Roman losses 

Cassius Dio wrote that "Many Romans, moreover, perished in this war. Therefore, Hadrian, in writing to the Senate, did not employ the opening phrase commonly affected by the emperors: 'If you and your children are in health, it is well; I and the army are in health.'" Some argue that the exceptional number of preserved Roman veteran diplomas from the late 150s and 160 CE indicate an unprecedented conscription across the Roman Empire to replenish heavy losses within military legions and auxiliary units between 133 and 135, corresponding to the revolt.

As noted above, XXII Deiotariana may have been disbanded after serious losses. In addition, some historians argue that Legio IX Hispana's disbandment in the mid-2nd century could have been a result of this war. Previously it had generally been accepted that the Ninth disappeared around 108 CE, possibly suffering its demise in Britain, according to Mommsen; but archaeological findings in 2015 from Nijmegen, dated to 121 CE, contained the known inscriptions of two senior officers who were deputy commanders of the Ninth in 120 CE, and lived on for several decades to lead distinguished public careers. It was concluded that the Legion was disbanded between 120 and 197 CE—either as a result of fighting the Bar Kokhba revolt, or in Cappadocia (161), or at the Danube (162). Legio X Fretensis sustained heavy casualties during the revolt.

Other casualties 
The revolt was led by the Judean Pharisees, with other Jewish and non-Jewish factions also playing a role. Jewish communities of Galilee who sent militants to the revolt in Judea were largely spared total destruction, though they did suffer persecutions and massive executions. Samaria partially supported the revolt, with evidence accumulating that notable numbers of Samaritan youths participated in Bar Kokhba's campaigns; though Roman wrath was directed at Samaritans, their cities were also largely spared from the total destruction unleashed on Judea. Eusebius of Caesarea wrote that Jewish Christians were killed and suffered "all kinds of persecutions" at the hands of rebel Jews when they refused to help Bar Kokhba against the Roman troops. The Greco-Roman population of the region also suffered severely during the early stage of the revolt, persecuted by Bar Kokhba's forces.

Later relations between the Jews and the Roman Empire

Relations between the Jews in the region and the Roman Empire continued to be complicated. Constantine I allowed Jews to mourn their defeat and humiliation once a year on Tisha B'Av at the Western Wall. In 351–352 CE, the Jews of Galilee launched yet another revolt, provoking heavy retribution. The Gallus revolt came during the rising influence of early Christians in the Eastern Roman Empire, under the Constantinian dynasty. In 355, however, the relations with the Roman rulers improved, upon the rise of Emperor Julian, the last of the Constantinian dynasty, who, unlike his predecessors, defied Christianity. In 363, not long before Julian left Antioch to launch his campaign against Sassanian Persia, he ordered the Jewish Temple rebuilt in his effort to foster religions other than Christianity. The failure to rebuild the Temple has mostly been ascribed to the dramatic Galilee earthquake of 363, and traditionally also to the Jews' ambivalence about the project. Sabotage is a possibility, as is an accidental fire, though Christian historians of the time ascribed it to divine intervention. Julian's support of Judaism caused Jews to call him "Julian the Hellene". Julian's fatal wound in the Persian campaign put an end to Jewish aspirations, and Julian's successors embraced Christianity through the entirety of Byzantine rule of Jerusalem, preventing any Jewish claims.

In 438 CE, when the Empress Eudocia removed the ban on Jews' praying at the Temple site, the heads of the Community in Galilee issued a call "to the great and mighty people of the Jews" which began: "Know that the end of the exile of our people has come!" However the Christian population of the city saw this as a threat to their primacy, and a riot erupted which chased Jews from the city.

During the 5th and the 6th centuries, a series of Samaritan revolts broke out across the Palaestina Prima province. Especially violent were the third and the fourth revolts, which resulted in near annihilation of the Samaritan community. It is likely that the Samaritan revolt of 556 was joined by the Jewish community, which had also suffered brutal suppression of their religion under Emperor Justinian.

In the belief of restoration to come, in the early 7th century the Jews made an alliance with the Persians, joining the Persian invasion of Palaestina Prima in 614 to overwhelm the Byzantine garrison, and gaining autonomous rule over Jerusalem. However, their autonomy was brief: the Jewish leader was shortly assassinated during a Christian revolt and, though Jerusalem was reconquered by Persians and Jews within 3 weeks, it fell into anarchy. With the subsequent withdrawal of Persian forces, Jews surrendered to the Byzantines in 625 CE or 628 CE. Byzantine control of the region was finally lost to Muslim Arab armies in 637 CE, when Umar ibn al-Khattab completed the conquest of Akko.

Archaeology

Destroyed Jewish villages and fortresses
Several archaeological excavations have been performed during the 20th and 21st centuries in ruins of Roman-period Jewish villages across Judea and Samaria, as well in the Roman-dominated cities on the coastal plain. Most of the villages in Judea's larger region show signs of devastation or abandonment that dates to the Bar-Kokhba revolt. Buildings and underground installations carved out beneath or close to towns, such as hiding complexes, burial caves, storage facilities, and field towers, have both been found to have destruction layers and abandonment deposits. Furthermore, there is a gap in settlement above these levels. Fragmentary material from Transjordan and the Galilee adds to the discoveries from Judea.

Excavations at archaeological sites such as Hurvat Itri and Kiryat Sefer have demonstrated that these Jewish villages were destroyed following the revolt and were subsequently inhabited by pagan populations.

Herodium was excavated by archaeologist Ehud Netzer in the 1980s, publishing results in 1985. According to findings, during the later Bar-Kokhba revolt, complex tunnels were dug, connecting the earlier cisterns with one another. These led from the Herodium fortress to hidden openings, which allowed surprise attacks on Roman units besieging the hill. As opposed to the narrow and restricted tunnel complexes from the Judean plain, the Herodium tunnels were broad, with high ceilings, allowing for rapid movement of armed soldiers.

The ruins of Betar, the last standing stronghold of Bar Kokhba, can be found at Khirbet al-Yahud, an archeological site located in the vicinity of Battir and Beitar Illit. A stone inscription bearing Latin characters and discovered near the site shows that the Fifth Macedonian Legion and the Eleventh Claudian Legion took part in the siege.

Hideout systems 
The Bar Kokhba revolt has been better understood thanks to the discovery of artificially-carved hideout systems under many sites across Judea. Their discovery is consistent with Cassius Dio's writings, which reported that the rebels used underground networks as part of their tactics to avoid direct confrontations with the Romans. Many were hewn in earlier times and were utilized by rebels during the revolt as indicated by the usage of Bar Kokhba revolt coinage and other archeological findings.

Hideout systems were found at more than 130 archaeological sites in Judea; most of them in the Judaean Lowlands, but also in the Judaean Mountains, and even in the Galilee. Examples include: Hurvat Midras, Tel Goded, Maresha, Aboud and others.

Refuge caves

Near the end of the uprising, many Jews fleeing for their life sought asylum in refuge caves, the most of which are found in Israel's Judaean Desert on high cliffs overlooking the Dead Sea and the Jordan Valley. The majority of these caves are large natural caverns (with few man-made modifications) that are situated in nearly inaccessible vertical cliffs. 

They carried luxury goods, cash, firearms, papers and deeds, and even the keys to their homes as a hint that they intended to return there once the fighting was over. These items were frequently discovered with their owners' bones in caverns, which is evidence of their tragic fate. The Cave of Letters in Nahal Hever and the caverns in Wadi Murabba'at, which yielded a plethora of written records from the time of the revolt, are among the best-known refuge caves.

The Cave of Letters was surveyed in explorations conducted in 1960–1961, when letters and fragments of papyri were found dating back to the period of the Bar Kokhba revolt. Some of these were personal letters between Simeon bar Kokhba and his subordinates, and one notable bundle of papyri, known as the Babata or Babatha cache, revealed the life and trials of a woman, Babata, who lived during this period.
Cave of Horror is the name given to Cave 8, where the skeletons of 40 Jewish refugees from the Bar Kokhba revolt, including men, women and children, were discovered. Three potsherds with the names of three of the deceased were also found alongside the skeletons in the cave.

Roman legionary camps
A number of locations have been identified with Roman Legionary camps in the time of the Bar Kokhba War, including in Tel Shalem, Jerusalem, Lajjun and more.

Jerusalem inscription dedicated to Hadrian (129/30 CE)
In 2014, one half of a Latin inscription was discovered in Jerusalem during excavations near the Damascus Gate. It was identified as the right half of a complete inscription, the other part of which was discovered nearby in the late 19th century and is currently on display in the courtyard of Jerusalem's Studium Biblicum Franciscanum Museum. The complete inscription was translated as follows:
 To the Imperator Caesar Traianus Hadrianus Augustus, son of the deified Traianus Parthicus, grandson of the deified Nerva, high priest, invested with tribunician power for the 14th time, consul for the third time, father of the country (dedicated by) the 10th legion Fretensis Antoniniana.
The inscription was dedicated by Legio X Fretensis to the emperor Hadrian in the year 129/130 CE. The inscription is considered to greatly strengthen the claim that indeed the emperor visited Jerusalem that year, supporting the traditional claim that Hadrian's visit was among the main causes of the Bar Kokhba Revolt, and not the other way around.

Tel Shalem triumphal arc and Hadrian's statue
The location was identified as a Roman military post during the 20th century, with archaeological excavation performed in the late 20th century following an accidental discovery of Hadrian's bronze statue in the vicinity of the site in 1975. Remains of a large Roman military camp and fragments of a triumphal arc dedicated to Emperor Hadrian were consequently discovered at the site.

Geographic extent of the revolt
Over the years, two schools formed in the analysis of the Revolt. One of them is maximalists, who claim that the revolt spread through the entire Judea Province and beyond it into neighboring provinces. The second one is that of the minimalists, who restrict the revolt to the area of the Judaean hills and immediate environs.

Judea proper
It is generally accepted that the Bar Kokhba revolt encompassed all of Judea, namely the villages of the Judean hills, the Judean desert, and northern parts of the Negev desert. It is not known whether the revolt spread outside of Judea.

Jerusalem
Until 1951, Bar Kokhba Revolt coinage was the sole archaeological evidence for dating the revolt. These coins include references to "Year One of the redemption of Israel", "Year Two of the freedom of Israel", and "For the freedom of Jerusalem". Despite the reference to Jerusalem, as of early 2000s, archaeological finds, and the lack of revolt coinage found in Jerusalem, supported the view that the revolt did not capture Jerusalem.

In 2020, the fourth Bar Kokhba minted coin and the first inscribed with the word "Jerusalem" was found in Jerusalem Old City excavations. Despite this discovery, the Israel Antiques Authority still maintained the opinion that Jerusalem was not taken by the rebels, due to the fact that of thousands of Bar Kokhba coins had been found outside Jerusalem, but only four within the city (out of more than 22,000 found within the city). The Israel Antiques Authority's archaeologists Moran Hagbi and Dr. Joe Uziel speculated that "It is possible that a Roman soldier from the Tenth Legion found the coin during one of the battles across the country and brought it to their camp in Jerusalem as a souvenir."

Galilee
Among those findings are the rebel hideout systems in the Galilee, which greatly resemble the Bar Kokhba hideouts in Judea, and though are less numerous, are nevertheless important. The fact that Galilee retained its Jewish character after the end of the revolt has been taken as an indication by some that either the revolt was never joined by Galilee or that the rebellion was crushed relatively early there compared to Judea.

Northern valleys
Several historians, notably W. Eck of the U-ty of Cologne, theorized that the Tel Shalem arch depicted a major battle between Roman armies and Bar Kokhba's rebels in Bet Shean valley, thus extending the battle areas some 50 km northwards from Judea. The 2013 discovery of the military camp of Legio VI Ferrata near Tel Megiddo, and ongoing excavations there may shed light to extension of the rebellion to the northern valleys. However, Eck's theory on battle in Tel Shalem is rejected by M. Mor, who considers the location implausible given Galilee's minimal (if any) participation in the Revolt and distance from the main conflict flareup in Judea proper.

Samaria
A 2015 archaeological survey in Samaria identified some 40 hideout cave systems from the period, some containing Bar Kokhba's minted coins, suggesting that the war raged in Samaria at high intensity.

Transjordan
Bowersock suggested of linking the Nabateans to the revolt, claiming "a greater spread of hostilities than had formerly been thought... the extension of the Jewish revolt into northern Transjordan and an additional reason to consider the spread of local support among Safaitic tribes and even at Gerasa."

Sources
The revolt is mostly still shrouded in mystery, and only one brief historical account of the rebellion survives.

Dio Cassius 
The best recognized source for the revolt is Cassius Dio, Roman History (book 69), even though the writings of the Roman historian concerning the Bar Kokhba revolt survived only as fragments. The account extends on about two pages and is largely an historical perspective with the general course of the rebellion and its disastrous results, without mentioning specific names and locations. Notably, the name of the Jewish leader doesn't even appear in this account.

Eusebius of Caesarea 
The Christian author Eusebius of Caesarea wrote a brief account of the revolt within the Church History (Eusebius) compilation, notably mentioning Bar Chochebas (which means “star” according to Eusebius) as the leader of the Jewish rebels and their last stand at Beththera (i.e. Betar). Though Eusebius lived one and a half centuries after the revolt and wrote the brief account from the Christian theological perspective, his account provides important details on the revolt and its aftermath in Judea. Eusebius does also describe what had remained of Jewish population of Judea at his time—naming seven Jewish communities in Roman Palaestina (former Judaea).

Jerusalem Talmud 
The Jerusalem Talmud contains descriptions of the results of the rebellion, including the Roman executions of Judean leaders and religious persecution. The material however is lacking context and detail, though does contain reference to the Roman Governor Rufus (as Tinusrufus) and names the Jewish leader as Ben Kuziba.

Primary sources 

The discovery of the Cave of Letters in the Dead Sea area, dubbed as "Bar Kokhba archive", which contained letters actually written by Bar Kokhba and his followers, has added much new primary source data, indicating among other things that either a pronounced part of the Jewish population spoke only Greek or there was a foreign contingent among Bar Kokhba's forces, accounted for by the fact that his military correspondence was, in part, conducted in Greek. Close to the Cave of Letters is the Cave of Horror, where the remains of Jewish refugees from the rebellion were discovered along with fragments of letters and writings. Several more brief sources have been uncovered in the area over the past century, including references to the revolt from Nabatea and Roman Syria. Roman inscriptions in Tel Shalem, Betar fortress, Jerusalem and other locations also contribute to the current historical understanding of the Bar Kokhba War.

Legacy

In Rabbinic Judaism 
The disastrous end of the revolt occasioned major changes in Jewish religious thought. Jewish messianism was abstracted and spiritualized, and rabbinical political thought became deeply cautious and conservative. The Talmud, for instance, refers to Bar Kokhba as "Ben-Kusiba", a derogatory term used to indicate that he was a false Messiah. The deeply ambivalent rabbinical position regarding Messianism, as expressed most famously in Maimonides "Epistle to Yemen," would seem to have its origins in the attempt to deal with the trauma of a failed Messianic uprising.

In Zionism and modern Israel 
In the post-rabbinical era, the Bar Kokhba Revolt became a symbol of valiant national resistance. The Zionist youth movement Betar took its name from Bar Kokhba's traditional last stronghold, and David Ben-Gurion, Israel's first prime minister, took his Hebrew last name from one of Bar Kokhba's generals.

A popular children's song, included in the curriculum of Israeli kindergartens, has the refrain "Bar Kokhba was a Hero/He fought for Liberty," and its words describe Bar Kokhba as being captured and thrown into a lion's den, but managing to escape riding on the lion's back.

See also
 List of conflicts in the Near East
 Sicaricon (Jewish law)

References

Bibliography 

 
 
 
 
 Yohannan Aharoni & Michael Avi-Yonah, The MacMillan Bible Atlas, Revised Edition, pp. 164–65 (1968 & 1977 by Carta Ltd.)
 The Documents from the Bar Kokhba Period in the Cave of Letters (Judean Desert studies). Jerusalem: Israel Exploration Society, 1963–2002.
 Vol. 2, "Greek Papyri", edited by Naphtali Lewis; "Aramaic and Nabatean Signatures and Subscriptions", edited by Yigael Yadin and Jonas C. Greenfield..
 Vol. 3, "Hebrew, Aramaic and Nabatean–Aramaic Papyri", edited Yigael Yadin, Jonas C. Greenfield, Ada Yardeni, BaruchA. Levine.
 W. Eck, 'The Bar Kokhba Revolt: the Roman point of view' in the Journal of Roman Studies 89 (1999) 76ff.
 Peter Schäfer (editor), Bar Kokhba reconsidered, Tübingen: Mohr: 2003
 Aharon Oppenheimer, 'The Ban of Circumcision as a Cause of the Revolt: A Reconsideration', in Bar Kokhba reconsidered, Peter Schäfer (editor), Tübingen: Mohr: 2003
 Faulkner, Neil. Apocalypse: The Great Jewish Revolt Against Rome. Stroud, Gloucestershire, UK: Tempus Publishing, 2004 (hardcover).
 Goodman, Martin. The Ruling Class of Judaea: The Origins of the Jewish Revolt against Rome, A.D. 66–70. Cambridge: Cambridge University Press, 1987 (hardcover); 1993 (paperback).
 Richard Marks: The Image of Bar Kokhba in Traditional Jewish Literature: False Messiah and National Hero: University Park: Pennsylvania State University Press: 1994: 
 
 David Ussishkin: "Archaeological Soundings at Betar, Bar-Kochba's Last Stronghold", in: Tel Aviv. Journal of the Institute of Archaeology of Tel Aviv University 20 (1993) 66ff.
 Yadin, Yigael. Bar-Kokhba: The Rediscovery of the Legendary Hero of the Second Jewish Revolt Against Rome. New York: Random House, 1971 (hardcover); London: Weidenfeld and Nicolson, 1971 (hardcover).
 Mildenberg, Leo. The Coinage of the Bar Kokhba War. Switzerland: Schweizerische Numismatische Gesellschaft, Zurich, 1984 (hardcover).

External links
 Wars between the Jews and Romans: Simon ben Kosiba (130-136 CE), with English translations of sources.
 Photographs from Yadin's book Bar Kokhba
 Archaeologists find tunnels from Jewish revolt against Romans by the Associated Press. Haaretz March 13, 2006
 Bar Kokba and Bar Kokba War Jewish Encyclopedia
 Sam Aronow - The Bar Kochba Revolt | 132 - 136

 
132
133
134
135
136
130s in the Roman Empire
130s conflicts
2nd-century rebellions
Genocide of indigenous peoples
Jewish nationalism
Jewish rebellions
Jewish refugees
Jews and Judaism in the Roman Empire
Judea (Roman province)
Religion-based wars
Genocides in Asia